The Greeks in Uzbekistan number approximately 9,000. The community is made up of Greeks from Russia who were deported by force from that country to Uzbekistan in the 1940s, and political refugees from Greece. About 30,000 Greeks lived in the country before World War II and a further 11,000 arrived after the Greek Civil War and the defeat of Democratic Army of Greece. Their numbers have dwindled from a high of some 40,000 in the 1960s. The main reason is emigration to Greece after the end of the Cold War when laws allowed the return of all ethnic Greeks who had been exiled for political reasons after the Greek Civil War. The biggest Greek community in the country is in the capital city of Tashkent where most of the Greek political refugees were relocated by the Soviet authorities. In ancient times the south of the country was part of the Hellenistic Seleucid Kingdom but the few Greek communities there have since assimilated. 

The most important organization representing ethnic Greeks is the Greek Cultural Association of Tashkent. The activities of this organization include Greek language instruction (19 classes with a total of 571 students, classes for adults) and the teaching of Greek dances and music.

Notable people
Vasilis Hatzipanagis, footballer for Iraklis in the 1970s and 1980s
Lefteris Pantazis, Greek singer
Elena Tornikidou, former basketball player
Evangelos Goussis, Australian kickboxer
Dimitris Papadopoulos, Greek former professional footballer
Yannis Mandzukas, footballer

See also
Greek people
Greek diaspora
Greeks in Kazakhstan
Greeks in Kyrgyzstan

References

Ethnic groups in Uzbekistan
Uzbekistan
Uzbekistani people of Greek descent